Heiyangsan is a mountain in North Gyeongsang Province, South Korea. It has an elevation of 998 metres.

See also
List of mountains of Korea

References

Mountains of South Korea
Mountains of North Gyeongsang Province